The 2018 Jacksonville Dolphins football team represented Jacksonville University in the 2018 NCAA Division I FCS football season. They were led by third-year head coach Ian Shields and played their home games at D. B. Milne Field. They were members of the Pioneer Football League (PFL). they finished the season 2–8, 1–7 in PFL play to finish in last place.

Previous season
The Dolphins finished the 2017 season 7–4, 5–3 in PFL play to finish in a three-way tie for third place.

Preseason

Preseason All-PFL team
The PFL released their preseason all-PFL team on July 30, 2018, with the Dolphins having two players selected.

Defense

Caysaun Wakeley – LB

Trevor Tufano – LB

Preseason coaches poll
The PFL released their preseason coaches poll on July 31, 2018, with the Dolphins predicted to finish in sixth place.

Schedule

Source: Schedule

Game summaries

St. Augustine's

at Mercer

Drake

at Davidson

Marist

at Stetson

at San Diego

Butler

at Valparaiso

Dayton

References

Jacksonville
Jacksonville Dolphins football seasons
Jacksonville Dolphins football